Christa Ingeborg Prinzessin von Thurn und Taxis (née Heinle; born 14 December 1941) is the current president of the Bavarian Red Cross (BRK) and a member of the Princely House of Thurn and Taxis by marriage.

Marriage and issue
Christa Heinle married Prince Max Emanuel of Thurn and Taxis, only child of Prince Raphael Rainer of Thurn and Taxis and his wife Princess Margarete of Thurn and Taxis, civilly on 14 March 1973 in Schwangau, Bavaria, Germany, and religiously on 15 March 1973 at Schloss Bullachberg in Bavaria.

They had two sons:
Prince Hubertus of Thurn and Taxis (born 22 June 1973)
Prince Philipp of Thurn and Taxis (born 19 April 1975)

Functionary and honorary positions

Beginning in 1985, Christa was the Bavarian Red Cross (BRK) vice chairman for the district of Ostallgäu, and from 1989, for the region of Swabia. Christa served in these positions until 2005. Since 1989, she has been a member of the BRK-Land Board and the Committee for Social Services and since 1994, the Federal Committee for Welfare and Social Work in BRK. From 1993 to 2001, Christa was a member BRK Committee for Readiness and in 1995 she was a founding member of the Academy of the German Red Cross.

From 1997 to 2000, she was a senator in the Landtag of Bavaria. In November 1999, Christa began serving as Vice President of BRK. On 8 November 2003, she became the first woman to be elected President of the Bavarian Red Cross; she had already led the organization for the past five months after the previous president scaled down his duties due to health problems. In the same year, she was also member of the Council Pen (Stiftsratsvorsitzende Jutta Lowag) of the women's pen on Luitpoldpark in Munich.

References

1941 births
Living people
People from Heidenheim
Princesses of Thurn und Taxis
Politicians from Bavaria
Recipients of the Cross of the Order of Merit of the Federal Republic of Germany
Morganatic spouses of German royalty